Henry Morrison may refer to:
 Henry Morrison (cricketer) (1850–1913), New Zealand cricketer for Otago
 Henry C. Morrison (1871–1945), American educator
 Henry Clay Morrison (1857–1942), American evangelist and Asbury College president